The 1864 United States presidential election in Delaware took place on November 8, 1864, as part of the 1864 United States presidential election. State voters chose three representatives, or electors, to the Electoral College, who voted for president and vice president.

Delaware was won by the 4th Commanding General of the United States Army George B. McClellan (D–New Jersey), running with Representative George H. Pendleton, with 51.81%	 of the popular vote against the incumbent President Abraham Lincoln (R-Illinois), running with former Senator and Military Governor of Tennessee Andrew Johnson, with 48.19% of the popular vote.

Results

See also
 United States presidential elections in Delaware

References

Delaware
1864